The 1969 Pacific Southwest Open – Men's singles was an event of the 1969 Pacific Southwest Open tennis tournament and was played on outdoor hard courts at the Los Angeles Tennis Center in Los Angeles, California in the United States between September 22 and September 28, 1969. Rod Laver was the defending Pacific Southwest Open champion and was the top-seed but lost in the second round. Tenth-seeded Pancho Gonzales won the singles title by defeating 16th-seeded Cliff Richey in the final 6–0, 7–5.

Seeds

Draw

Finals

Top half

Section 1

Section 2

Bottom half

Section 3

Section 4

References

External links
 ITF tournament edition details

Los Angeles Open (tennis)
Pacific Southwest Open
Pacific Southwest Open